This college is led by Thiru.I.Krishnapillai, the chairman and the managing trustee, Sri Vinayaga Educationbal Trust. He is also the chairman of cape group of companies. The institution which was established in 2001 is located at the southern tip of India, "Triveni Sangamam". The campus is spread over 100 acres.

References 

Colleges in Tamil Nadu
Education in Tirunelveli district
Educational institutions established in 2001
2001 establishments in Tamil Nadu